Eric Littler (14 April 1929 – 2009) is an English former footballer who played in the Football League for Crewe Alexandra, Leicester City, Lincoln City and Wrexham.

External links
 Eric Littler stats at Neil Brown stat site

English footballers
English Football League players
Leicester City F.C. players
Lincoln City F.C. players
Wrexham A.F.C. players
Crewe Alexandra F.C. players
Pilkington F.C. players
1960 births
2009 deaths
Association football forwards